Deep green may refer to:
Any dark or rich shade of green
Deep Green, decision-making support system for United States Army commanders
Deep Green Resistance, a branch of radical environmental theory and its associated movement
Deep ecology, an ecological and environmental philosophy
"Deep Green", a song by Big Red Machine from their self-titled album
"Deep Green", an album by Jack Lancaster